Freedom is an unincorporated community located in the town of Freedom, Outagamie County, Wisconsin, United States. Freedom has a post office, located in Kaukauna, which uses ZIP code 54131.

Before the establishment of the Town of Freedom on June 5, 1853, evidence suggests that this community was named Sagole or Sagola, a Native American word meaning "good morning". Further, this name's use fell out of favor after the name of the surrounding town was established, and the community began using the name Freedom as well.
Freedom is home to a very successful high school as well. They have won many state championships.

Images

References

Unincorporated communities in Outagamie County, Wisconsin
Unincorporated communities in Wisconsin